Little Brampton is a hamlet in south Shropshire, England.

It is located between Purslow and Aston on Clun, and is on the border of the civil parishes of Clunbury and Hopesay.

Little Brampton is situated on a notable crossroads in the Clun valley, where the B4385 (from Lydbury North) and B4368 (running between Clun and Craven Arms) roads meet, as well as the lane down to the village of Clunbury. The River Kemp flows just to the south of the hamlet; the Clun flows further south near Clunbury.

The road that runs from Little Brampton to the centre of Bishop's Castle (a section of the B4385) is named "Brampton Road".

There is a tea room called The Old Wheelwrights at the crossroads.

By the crossroads is an ornamental road direction sign for local destinations.

See also
Listed buildings in Clunbury

References

Hamlets in Shropshire